Gordon Cunningham (commonly referred to as Mr. C) is a fictional character from the British Channel 4 soap opera Hollyoaks, played by Bernard Latham. He first appeared in March 1996, and departed on 16 February 2004 when he died of a heart attack following a car accident. He last appeared for a brief return on 11 July 2008 during a dream sequence broadcast on T4.

Storylines
Gordon begins to comfort his daughter Dawn when she struggles to fend off the advances of her mother's new boyfriend, Terry Williams . Gordon tries to help his ex-wife, Angela overcome her crippling debts and tries to inject some discipline into the lives of their wayward children. Gordon soon builds up a witty repartee with Tony Hutchinson, when he becomes landlord of Got it Taped, and finds himself in various scrapes in his desperate attempts to keep Max and Cindy on the straight and narrow. However, things get bad for Gordon as he discover that Cindy was pregnant, and loses Dawn to leukaemia, and also is saddened when Jude runs off the next year after getting herself in trouble with the police.
Gordon opens his own mini supermarket called Drive 'n' Buy. He rediscovers the joys of romance later in life, falling for the recently divorced Helen Richardson. When he discovers that Helen is pregnant with his child, he does the honourable thing and asks her to marry him. With Helen come her children, Mandy and Lewis Richardson, promoting the merging of the Cunningham and Richardson families. Soon, Gordon becomes "Councillor of Chester", after he beats tough competition from Tony Hutchinson and Matt Musgrove. With the Richardson family comes considerable angst, culminating in Lewis's suicide, yet Gordon proves himself as the rock to his wife and together they have a son called Tom. Gordon began to become self-conscious. After he turns fifty, he begins a 'new look' to make himself look younger with the help of student, Nick O'Connor.

Gordon's world ruptures when Max tells him that Helen is having an affair with Tony. Gordon is shattered even more when Helen decides to leave him for Tony, but Gordon is convinced that Helen will come back to him. Struggling to cope without Helen, Gordon receives comfort from David "Bombhead" Burke. Gordon becomes a father figure to Bombhead. Eventually, Helen returns to Gordon and with some match fixing from Mandy and Max, the pair are reunited. However, tragedy strikes for Gordon when he has a random heart attack and ends up crashing the car. Gordon takes a heart attack immediately and dies in hospital. Helen also dies a few weeks later and Tom is left as an orphan. In Helen and Gordon's wills, Tom is supposed to live with Mandy but instead he goes to live with Max. Bombhead takes the news of Gordon's death badly. When his mum dies, he starts to see Gordon's ghost (reprised by Bernard Latham) who tries to convince him to tell his friends about his mum's death and that he needs help. After he gets help, his visions of Gordon's ghost stop. Max dies on 27 June 2008. In a short  dream sequence skit shown on T4 after the omnibus edition,  Max is reunited with Gordon in heaven. Whilst father and son are overcome with emotion at being reunited, Max tells his father that he has sold Drive 'n' Buy. Gordon's joy of the reunion vanishes, as he smacks Max around the head and calls him a "berk".

In a 2009 non-canon special entitled Hollyoaks: The Good, the Bad and the Gorgeous, Latham returns to reprise the role of Gordon once again from beyond the grave, where he runs a cinema showing previous Hollyoaks clips.

Development

Gordon was an irascible though kind-hearted man who often displayed an amazing tendency to infuriate those that loved him the most. Gordon often had to deal with family problems including daughter Dawn's leukaemia, Cindy's teenage pregnancy and his ill-fated marriage to Helen. Gordon had four children to first wife Angela, they are Max, Dawn, Cindy and Jude. In 1999, Gordon married Helen Richardson, who then gave birth to Tom.

References

Hollyoaks characters
Fictional businesspeople
Television characters introduced in 1996
Cunningham family
Male characters in television